The Voice Kids was an Australian television talent show that premiered on the Nine Network on 22 June 2014. It featured Delta Goodrem, Mel B and The Madden Brothers as the coaches.

Development

Auditions

The auditions were opened to anyone between the age of 8 and 14, as of 1 January 2014. Contestants were to submit an online application via The Voice official website, which ended on 24 September 2013. Selected applicants out of the 8,000 hopefuls who applied for the auditions were invited to the producers' auditions in various capital cities. Two of the audition cities were Perth, Western Australia, held on 18 October 2013; and Adelaide, South Australia.

The producers' auditions consisted of three stages. Firstly, the contestants were grouped and had to sing a song together. Selected contestants from the first stage then moved on to the second stage, where they had to sing for The Voice Kids head vocal coach, Lindsay Field. The last stage of the auditions required the contestants to sing for the show's executive producers.

For the online applicants who live more than 200 km away from their capital cities, they were not invited to the producers' auditions. Instead, the producers reviewed each of their online audition videos. At the end of the auditions, the producers narrowed down the artists to the 100 who progressed onto the Blinds to perform for the coaches.

Promotion
A special look at the series was premiered on 27 May 2014, featuring various artists from the Blinds covering an acoustic version of The Black Eyed Peas' "Let's Get It Started".

Format
The show is part of The Voice franchise and is structured as three phases: blind auditions, battle rounds and live performance shows. The winner receives a recording contract with Universal Music.

Blind auditions
Three coaches, all noteworthy recording artists, choose teams of contestants through a blind audition process. Each coach has the length of the audition, a live performance lasting about one minute, to decide if he or she wants that singer on his or her team. If two or more judges want the same singer, the singer has the final choice of coach.

Coaches and hosts

On 26 November 2013, it was announced that Delta Goodrem and Joel Madden, who were the coaches from the adult version of the show, had signed on as the first two coaches. Goodrem announced her departure from the adult version of the show to focus on her music career, but decided to join The Voice Kids as it "allows her the time to continue working on the show, and to focus on new music". In her announcement, she also revealed that Joel would be joining her in the show. On 1 February 2014, Nine Network revealed that former Spice Girls member Mel B and Good Charlotte's Benji Madden were the final two coaches for the series. Benji would team up with his brother Joel on the show.

Darren McMullen, who is also the host for the adult version, was announced as the show's first host. The Voice season 1 quarter-finalist Prinnie Stevens was announced as the show's backstage correspondent during the Blinds.

Series overview

Teams
Colour key

  Winner
  Runner-up
  Eliminated in the Grand Finale
  Eliminated in the Sing-offs
  Eliminated in the Battles

Blind auditions 
The first episode of the Blinds premiered on 22 June 2014. Each coach had the length of the auditioner's performance to decide if they want that artist to be on their team; if more than one coach wants the same artist, then the artist gets to choose their coach.

Episode 1 (22 June)
The premiere episode aired for one hour and a half and was viewed by 1.652 million people.

Episode 2 (29 June)
The second episode was aired for one hour and a half and was viewed by 1.665 million people.

Episode 3 (6 July)
The third episode was aired for one hour and a half and was viewed by 1.255 million people.

Episode 4 (13 July)
The fourth episode was aired for one hour and a half and was viewed by 1.150 million people.

Episode 5 (20 July)
The fifth episode was aired for one hour and a half and was viewed by 1.227 million people.

Battles 
The battles began on 23 July and comprise episodes 6, 7, and 8. After the Blinds, each coach had 15 artists for the battles. Each battle consisted of three artists within each team and concluded with the respective coach eliminating two of the three artists. The five winners for each coach advanced to the Sing-offs.

Episode 6 (23 July)
The sixth episode was aired for one hour and a half.

Episode 7 (27 July)
The seventh episode was aired for one hour and a half.

Episode 8 (3 August)
The eighth episode was aired for one hour and a half. It featured the last three battles, followed by the premiere of the Sing-offs.

Sing-offs 
The Sing-offs began after the battles. The top fifteen artists perform for the coaches, with each coach eliminating three artists from their teams. The remaining top six artists advance to the Grand Finale.

Episode 8 (3 August)
The eighth episode was aired for one hour and a half. It featured the last three rounds of the Battles, followed by the premiere of the Sing-offs. In this phase, all artists reprised their performance from the Blinds.

Grand Finale 
The Grand finale is the final phase of the competition and was aired on 10 August. Unlike the adult version of the show, the Grand Finale was taped on 14 June 2014, with the final three's separate winning moments being pre-recorded. The public votes decided which of the three winning moments would go on air at the end of the show, crowning the respective artist as The Voice Kids.

Episode 9 (10 August)

Round 1 
In this phase, each finalist took the stage and performed a solo song. The coaches then eliminated one artist from their respective teams, forming the final three artists who advanced to the next round.

Round 2 
The final round of the competition featured the top three finalists singing their potential winner's single. For the first time in the series, an interactive viewer component was featured. Before the start of the performances, voting lines were opened live-in-show for the television audience to vote for the final three and decide the winner. The 15-minute voting window was opened between 8:25 p.m. and 8:40 p.m. The winner of The Voice Kids was announced at the end of the show.

Results summary

Colour key 

  Artist from Team Mel B
  Artist from Team Madden
  Artist from Team Delta
  Winner
  Runner-up
  Artist was saved by coach
  Artist was eliminated

Overall

Per team

Performances by guests/coaches

Artists' appearances on earlier talent shows
 Harmony and Imogen competed in the Network Ten reality television show Young Talent Time in 2012. Imogen was eliminated in the semifinals; while Harmony was a wildcard contender for the grand-final, but failed to progress.
 Shuan and Ky appeared on the fourth and fifth season of Australia's Got Talent respectively, making it to the semifinals.

Music releases by The Voice Kids artists
A compilation album titled The Voice Kids 2014 was released on 10 August 2014. Though planned to be released on 11 August 2014, the album was released digitally through iTunes a few hours before the Grand Finale on 10 August 2014. The album features 12 cover songs from the top six finalists.

Track listing

Release history

Concert tour by The Voice Kids artists

The Voice Kids: The Concert is a concert tour in Australia that features the artists of the first season of The Voice Kids, with the winner of the second season of The Voice Harrison Craig appearing as a special guest. The 6-date tour began on 26 September 2014 in Penrith, New South Wales and ended on 3 October 2014 in Melbourne, Victoria. The tour took place during the September school holidays in Australia and each concert lasted for two hours.

Performers

Setlist
All – "Let's Get It Started"
Harrison Craig – "Unchained Melody"
Craig – "You Raise Me Up"
Craig – "It Had Better Be Tonight"
Alexa Curtis – "Girl on Fire"
Curtis – "Colors of the Wind"
Curtis – "Playground"
Bella Yoseski – "The Voice Within"
Yoseski – "Mamma Knows Best"
Maddison Brooke – "Fighter"
Brooke – "Unconditionally"
Chris Lanzon – "The A Team"
Lanzon – "Wake Me Up"
Grace Laing – "Almost Is Never Enough"
Laing – "Burn"
Ruhi Lavaki – "Dynamite"
Lavaki – "If I Ain't Got You"
Robbie Anderson – "Hey, Soul Sister"
Anderson – "Yeah 3x"
Ethan Karpathy – "Kiss You"
Karpathy – "Give Me Love"
All – "Happy"

Additional notes
 Ruhi Lavaki only appeared at the show in Sydney, New South Wales on 28 September 2014.
 Grace Laing only appeared at the final two shows in Melbourne, Victoria on 2 and 3 October 2014.

Tour dates

Ratings

References

External links

See also

 List of Australian music television shows
 List of Australian television series
 List of programs broadcast by Nine Network

 
2014 Australian television series debuts
2014 Australian television series endings
Australian music television series
English-language television shows
Music competitions in Australia
Nine Network original programming
Television series about children
Television series about teenagers